Mortimer and Arabel is a BBC puppet comedy-drama series based on the book series of the same name by Joan Aiken (1924-2004) that was aired on BBC One as part of the Children's BBC strand (as it was known before October 4, 1997) from November 15, 1993 to December 21, 1994. Some of the original books, which were illustrated by Sir Quentin Blake, had also first been seen as a part of the BBC's Jackanory programmes. The stories are about a four-year-old girl named Arabel Jones who adopts an injured raven that her Dad, a cab driver named Ebenezer Jones, brings home after finding him injured in the road and christens "Mortimer", but his only communication is to squawk "Nevermore!" when upset. The Jones family live at 6 Rainwater Crescent in Rumbury Town, London NW3½ where most of their neighbours, including Mr. Coughtrack, Mr. and Mrs. Hamstring and especially grumpy old Mr. Leggitt, cannot stand Mortimer due to all the chaos he causes, and it is always up to Arabel to keep Mortimer out of trouble, although he frequently causes chaotic upsets with his mischievous behaviour. A total of thirty-six fifteen-minute episodes were produced over four serials of varying length in two series.

Other characters include Arabel's Mum Martha Jones, Mr. Leggitt's accomplices Bill and Joe, Mayor Saddlejoy and his wife, the Town Hall's secretary Doreen, Sergeant (later Mayor, after Saddlejoy retired from his position at the end of the first series) Cutlink, P.C. Barnoff, Arabel's babysitter Chris Cross (who was the only one of the Joneses' neighbours to also have a fondness for Mortimer), Mr. Leggitt's pet pigeon Pianono, a Scottish odd-job woman named Flo (known as "Have-A-Go Flo" and "In-The-Know Flo" by Mr. Leggitt's accomplices and "Odd-Job Flo" by Ebenezer), an Indian singer named Seleena, a Greek Professor from the island of Pollyargos, an American millionaire named Mr. Bonny, the Duchess of Skew, a farmer named Mr. Westropp, a herd of Jersey cows named Daisy, Lazy and Maisie, Ebenezer's Mum Granny Jones, Granny Jones's pet cat Augustus, Ebenezer's evil cousin Perce Jones, and a ghost named Sir Humphrey Burbage who haunted Mallards' Bank (a parody of Lloyds Bank, which was managed by a man named Mr. Sterrett and his assistant Miss Gracie, and cleaned by a woman named Mrs. Catchpenny) every night at Christmas until Mortimer and Arabel returned his gold, which he had hidden behind a loose brick with an "H" on in the Tower of London (where he was a prisoner during the day) while he was alive, but he died owing Mallards' Bank a considerable debt.

Series 1: Mortimer's Pocket (1993)
The first series was originally shown on BBC One on Mondays at 4:15pm and Wednesdays at 4:20pm between November 15 and December 22, 1993. This series was also released on VHS (BBCV 5249) under the same name as the show itself on April 5, 1994, but it is now out of print. However, both series were rereleased for download on the BBC Store in 2016 (with the second divided into its three respective parts).

Series 2 Part 1: Mortimer's Mine (October–November 1994)
The first part of the second series was originally shown on both Mondays and Wednesdays at 4:20pm between October 3 and November 9, 1994.

Series 2 Part 2: May Day in Rumbury (November 1994)
The second series' second third was originally shown on Mondays at 4:00pm and Wednesdays at 3:55pm from November 14 to November 30, 1994.

Series 2 Part 3: The Bank Ghost (December 1994)
The second series' final third was, again, shown on Mondays at 4:00pm and Wednesdays at 3:55pm, between December 5 and December 21, 1994.

References

External links
 Joan Aiken website

1990s British children's television series
1993 British television series debuts
1993 in British television
1994 British television series endings
BBC children's television shows
BBC Television shows
British children's comedy television series
British children's drama television series
British television shows featuring puppetry
Television shows based on British novels
Television series about birds
Television series about children